Shaykh Hadid  is a Syrian village located in the Karnaz Subdistrict of the Mahardah District in Hama Governorate. According to the Syria Central Bureau of Statistics (CBS), Shaykh Hadid had a population of 1,958 in the 2004 census. Its inhabitants are predominantly Sunni Muslims.

References 

Populated places in Mahardah District